Abū ʿAbd Allāh Muḥammad ibn ʿAbd Allāh al-Manṣūr (744 or 745 – 785), better known by his regnal name al-Mahdī ("He who is guided by God"), was the third Abbasid Caliph who reigned from 775 to his death in 785. He succeeded his father, al-Mansur.

Early life
Al-Mahdi was born in 744 or 745 AD in the village of Humeima (modern-day Jordan). His mother was called Arwa, and his father was al-Mansur. When al-Mahdi was ten years old, his father became the second Abbasid Caliph. When al-Mahdi was young, his father needed to establish al-Mahdi as a powerful figure in his own right. So, on the east bank of the Tigris, al-Mansur oversaw the construction of East Baghdad, with a mosque and royal palace at its heart. Construction in the area was also heavily financed by the Barmakids, and the area became known as Rusafa.

According to reports, he was tall, charming, and stylish; he had tan skin, a long forehead, and wavy hair. He loved women.

When he was 15-years-old, al-Mahdi was sent to defeat the uprising of Abdur Rahman bin Abdul Jabbar Azdi in Greater Khorasan. He also defeated the uprisings of Ispahbud, the governor of Tabaristan, and Astazsis, massacring more than 70,000 of his followers in Khorasan. These campaigns put Tabaristan, which was only nominally within the caliphate, firmly under Abbasid control. In 762 AD, al-Mahdi was the governor of the Abbasid Caliphate's eastern region, based in Ray. It was here that he fell in love with al-Khayzuran (translates as "bamboo"), a daughter of a warlord in Herat and had several children, including the fourth and fifth future Caliphs, al-Hadi and Harun al-Rashid. Around 770 AD (153 AH), al-Mahdi was appointed as Amir al-hajj. Al-Khayzuran was gifted to Mahdi by his father.

Reign 
Al-Mahdi's father, al-Mansur, died on the hajj to Mecca in 775. The throne then passed to al-Mansur's chosen successor, his son al-Mahdi. According to Marozzi, "[it] was, by the standards of the future, blood-soaked successions of the Abbasid caliphate, a model of order and decorum."

Al-Mahdi, whose nickname means "Rightly-guided" or "Redeemer", was proclaimed caliph when his father was on his deathbed. His peaceful reign continued the policies of his predecessors.

Mahdi commenced his rule by releasing several political prisoners, expanding and decorating the holy places of Mecca and Medina, and building fountains and lofts for Hajj pilgrims. He expanded the mail service, increased his secret service, fortified cities, and increased judicial appointments. His charitable giving was also impressive.

Rapprochement with the Alids in the Caliphate occurred under al-Mahdi's reign. The powerful Barmakid family, which had advised the Caliphs since the days of Abu al-‘Abbās as viziers, gained even greater powers under al-Mahdi's rule, and worked closely with the caliph to ensure the prosperity of the Abbasid state.

Al-Mahdi reigned for ten years. He imprisoned his most trusted vizier Ya'qub ibn Dawud. In the year 167 AH/ 783 AD, al-Mahdi instituted an official inquisition which led to the execution of alleged Zindiq (heretics). He was fond of music and poetry and during his caliphate many musicians and poets received his patronage and he supported musical expression and poetry across his dominion; accordingly, his son Ibrahim ibn al-Mahdi (779–839) and his daughter ‘Ulayya bint al-Mahdī (777-825) were both noted poets and musicians.

In 775, a Byzantine envoy, Tarath, travelled to Baghdad to convey the congratulations of the Byzantine emperor to al-Mahdi on his accession to the throne. Tarath was so pleased with the hospitality he received that he offered to put his engineering knowledge to use and build a mill that would generate annual profits, of 500,000 dirhams, equal to the cost of its construction. On completion, the envoy's forecast proved to be correct, and so, delighted, al-Mahdi ordered that all profits should be given to the envoy, even after he left Baghdad. It is believed this continued to his death, in 780.

While the first Abbasid caliphs were distracted with cementing their authority, the Byzantines were occupied fighting Slavic clans in Macedonia and Thrace and battling the Bulgars. Once Mahdi felt secure in his rule, he fought the Byzantines with more force than his predecessors. He increased his line of control from Syria to the Armenian frontier and claimed the strategic town of Tarsus, that linked Anatolia, Syria, and northern Iraq.

In 777 AD (160 AH) he put down the insurrection of Yusuf ibn Ibrahim in Khurasan. In the same year al-Mahdi deposed Isa ibn Musa as his successor and appointed his own son Musa al-Hadi in his place and took allegiance (bayah) for him from the nobles. In 778 AD (161 AH), he subdued the rebellion of Abdullah ibn Marwan ibn Muhammad, who was leading the Umayyad remnant in Syria.

Mahdi also embarked on two important military voyages, one in 779 and another in 781 with his son Harun. In this Mahdi was teaching and training his son to be the future Caliph, just as his father had prepared him.

Al-Mahdi was poisoned by one of his concubines in 785 AD (169 AH). The concubine's name was Hasanah and she was jealous of another female slave to who Mahdi was drawing closer. She prepared a dish of sweets and placed a poisonous pear at the top of the plate. The pit of the pear was removed and replaced with a lethal paste. She sent the dish to her adversary via a servant, however, Mahdi intercepted the plate and ate the pear without hesitation. Shortly afterward, he complained of stomach pain and died that night at 43 years old.

A separate account said Mahdi fell off his horse while hunting and died.

Cultural and administrative aspects of his reign 
The cosmopolitan city of Baghdad blossomed during al-Mahdi's reign. The city attracted immigrants from Arabia, Iraq, Syria, Persia, and lands as far away as Afghanistan and Spain. Baghdad was home to Christians, Jews, Hindus and Zoroastrians, in addition to the growing Muslim population. It became the world's largest city.

Al-Mahdi continued to expand the Abbasid administration, creating new diwans, or departments: for the army, the chancery, and taxation. Qadis or judges were appointed, and laws against non-Arabs were dropped.

The Barmakid family staffed these new departments. The Barmakids, who were of Persian extraction, had originally been Buddhists. Their short-lived Islamic legacy would count against them during the reign of Harun al-Rashid.

The introduction of paper from China (see Battle of Talas) in 751 had a profound effect. Paper had not yet been used in the West with the Arabs and Persians using papyrus and the Europeans using vellum. The paper related industry boomed in Baghdad where an entire street in the city center became devoted to sale of paper and books. The cheapness and durability of paper was a vital element in the efficient growth of the expanding Abbasid bureaucracy.

Al-Mahdi had two important religious policies: the persecution of the zanadiqa, or dualists, and the declaration of orthodoxy. Al-Mahdi focused on the persecution of the zanadiqa in order to improve his standing among the purist Shi'i, who wanted a harder line on heresies, and found the spread of syncretic Muslim-polytheist sects to be particularly virulent. Al-Mahdi declared that the caliph had the ability, and indeed the responsibility, to define the orthodox theology of Muslims to protect the umma against heresy. Al-Mahdi made great use of this broad, new power, and it would become important during the 'mihna' crisis of al-Ma'mun's reign.

Though Mahdi fulfilled most of his national and external goals during his reign, he was not as thrifty as his predecessor and father, al-Mansur had been. As a ruling caliph, Mehdi was very interested in consulting with Khaizuran in the all important daily affairs of the government. Mahdi vacationed for long periods of time at al-Rusafa, officially, allowed his wife, Khaizuran to run certain matters pertaining to the state, and in general, liked to have a good time. Former caliphs who embarked on the hajj pilgrimage to Mecca had made the long voyage with canteens full of muddy water and satchels of dates. Mahdi saw no reason for such extreme self-restraints, instead, he traveled like royalty, and even brought ice from lugged all the way from the mountains of northern Persia so that his drinks could be cold.

One day, Mahdi was out hunting deer. Shortly after embarking, Mahdi and his aide became disunited from the rest of his entourage. Soon the two became exhausted and hungry and luckily found a tent belonging to a poor bedouin and asked him if he had anything to eat. The man said yes and provided the two with bread, butter, and oil. Mahdi asked for wine and the bedouin gave him some. Mahdi asked the bedouin if he knew who he was and the bedouin, disinterested, said no he did not. In those days, of course, only a few people who did not live on royal grounds would have known the caliph by sight. Mahdi told the bedouin that he was a servant of the caliph. The bedouin, impressed, said that is a good job. After another cup of wine, Mahdi asked again if the bedouin knew who he was. The bedouin replied that Mahdi already told him. Mahdi said no, I was lying, I am one of the top generals in the Caliph's army. After another cup of wine, the caliph pronounced that in reality, he was in fact the caliph himself! The bedouin refused to serve Mahdi any more wine and exclaimed if he did so, next Mahdi would proclaim himself the messenger of God!

Family
Al-Mahdi's first concubine when he was a prince was Muhayyat. In 759–60, she gave birth to a son who died in infancy. Another concubine was Rahim, who was the mother of his oldest surviving child, Abbasa. Another was al-Khayzuran bint Atta. She was the mother of caliphs al-Hadi and Harun al-Rashid. She had another son named Isa, and a daughter named Banuqah or Banujah. She was born in Mecca and brought up in Jurash. She had two sisters, Salsal and Asma, and a brother Ghitrif. She was al-Mahdi's favourite wife. In 761, al-Mahdi married Raytah as his first wife after his return from Khurasan. She was the daughter of Caliph al-Saffah and his wife Umm Salamah, a Makhzumite. She gave birth to two sons, Ubaydallah and Ali.

Another concubine was al-Bahtariyah, the noble-born daughter of the Persian rebel, Masmughan of Damavand, against whom Mahdi was first sent to Khurasan. Her mother was Bakand, the daughter of Isbahbadh, Farrukhan the Little. She had a sister named Smyr. She bore al-Mahdi a son named for his grandfather, Mansur, and two daughters, Sulaimah and Aliyah. Another was Shaklah, a Negress. Her father was Khwanadan, steward of Masmughan. She had a brother named Humayd. She was acquired by al-Mahdi together with al-Bahtariyah, when she was a child. He presented her to his concubine Muhayyat, who, discovering a musical talent in the child, sent her to the famous school of Taif in the Hijaz for a thorough musical education. Years later al-Mahdi, then caliph, took her as his concubine. She gave birth to al-Mahdi's powerful and dark-skinned son Ibrahim.

Another concubine was Maknunah, a songstress. She was owned by al-Marwaniyyah. Al-Mahdi, while yet a prince, bought her for 100,000 silver dirhams. She found such favor with the prince that al-Khayzuran used to say, "No other woman of his made my position so difficult." She gave birth to al-Mahdi's daughter Ulayya. Another was Basbas. She was a songstress trained at Medina. He had bought her about the same period for 17,000 gold dinars. Another was Hasanah, a Persian. She was a songstress, and was al-Mahdi's favourite concubine. She gave al-Khayzuran some uneasy moments. According to some versions, she was unintentionally but tragically involved in al-Mahdi's death. Some other concubines were Hullah, another songstress, and Malkah.

Al-Mahdi's second wife was Asma, al-Khayzuran's younger sister. She grew up at the court. In 775–776, al-Mahdi formed a sudden attachment for her. He then married her, settling on her a marriage portion of one million dirhams. Al-Khayzuran, who had been on the pilgrimage, learned of the marriage. After her return, al-Mahdi divorced Asma, and married al‐Khayzuran as his third wife. That same year, he married his fourth wife Umm Abdullah, a noble Arab woman. The next year he married his fifth wife Ruqaiyah, an Uthmanid. After al-Mahdi's death, she was married by an Alid prince.

References

Bibliography
 al-Masudi. The Meadows of Gold, The Abbasids. transl. Paul Lunde and Caroline Stone, Kegan Paul, London and New York, 1989.
 
 
 
 

740s births
785 deaths
Year of birth uncertain
Arab Muslims
8th-century Abbasid caliphs
8th-century rulers in Asia
8th-century rulers in Africa
8th-century rulers in Europe
8th-century Arabs
One Thousand and One Nights characters
Sons of Abbasid caliphs
Harun al-Rashid